Greg Alyn Carlson (November 2, 1971 – February 13, 2019) was an American criminal formerly on the FBI Ten Most Wanted Fugitives list from September 27, 2018, to February 13, 2019.

Background
Carlson was an alleged sexual predator involved in multiple armed sexual assaults in Los Angeles, California, and was wanted by the Los Angeles Police Department for assault with intent to commit rape as well as wanted by the FBI on charges of unlawful flight to avoid prosecution.

Carlson was the 520th fugitive to be placed on the FBI's Ten Most Wanted Fugitives list.

Death
Carlson was shot dead by FBI agents in Apex, North Carolina, after being located on February 13, 2019. Authorities found him hiding at a hotel and attempted to take him into custody. Upon entering his room a violent altercation occurred, resulting in Carlson's death.

References

1971 births
2019 deaths
American male criminals
Deaths by firearm in North Carolina
FBI Ten Most Wanted Fugitives
Fugitives
People shot dead by law enforcement officers in the United States
Place of birth missing